The Sign Assisted Instruction Programme is carried out by the Lutheran School For The Deaf starting from February 2012 with funding from the Quality Education Fund.

Background 
Most deaf students have cochlear implants subsidized by the Hong Kong government installed, but the senior communications officer of Equal Opportunities Commission, Chen Jie-zhen, pointed out that the ability of cochlear implants is limited. There are reports from students stating that only faint sounds can be heard most of the time and the implant cannot resolve learning difficulties. The Lutheran School For The Deaf teaches verbally, assisted by sign language so that students can learn more easily.

However, Hong Kong lacks an unified and complete sign language. Most sign languages are created by different local deaf organizations so a vocabulary may have several expressions. Moreover, most vocabularies are about daily life and specialized vocabularies related to education are insufficient.

Goals 
From February 2012 to January 2015, a three-year plan is carried out.  The goals are:
 Ensure teachers teach both verbally and with sign language
 Establish a sign language education resource center
 Sort out common sign language vocabularies to help deaf students systematically construct one common sign language to facilitate communication and learning
 Develop specialized vocabularies for school subjects to help deaf students understand course content and consolidate learnt materials
 Provide sign language training for teachers to facilitate teaching
 Promote atmosphere of learning sign language
 Support learning of sign language by relatives of deaf students
 Provide deaf students and special needs teaching staff with channels for learning sign language to assist in learning and teaching

From February 2015 to July 2017, a two-year plan is carried out.  The goals are:
 Optimize visual sign language dictionary continuously to help deaf students balance sign language and oral development
 Develop convenient sign language learning tool to promote development of sign language
 Create a good listening atmosphere to decrease learning differences
 Help teachers and deaf students to develop continuously
 Develop perks of deaf students and provide vocational sign language training
 Facilitate communication between deaf students and their parents
 Promote sign language and deaf culture to foster school communion and professional interschool exchanges

Reception 
The founder of Silence, Polly Lam, said that the number of special schools for the deaf in Hong Kong has decreased from three to one. She also pointed out that previous special schools do not teach sign language so students who are deaf completely are forced to listen with little hearing ability or lip read. As a result, students cannot learn fully. Even if the family can afford tutoring, it wastes time. It makes students lose interest in learning and feel frustrated.

See also 
 Lutheran School For The Deaf
 Hong Kong Sign Language
 Deafness

References

External links 
 Official website
 

Sign languages
Education in Hong Kong
Deaf education
2012 establishments in Hong Kong